Herald Marku (born 18 May 1996) is an Albanian professional footballer who plays as a midfielder for Vllaznia Shkodër.

Club career

International career

Albania U17
Marku received his first Albania under-17 call-up by manager Džemal Mustedanagić for a friendly tournament developed in August 2012 in Romania.

References

1996 births
Living people
People from Laç
Albanian footballers
Association football midfielders
FK Partizani Tirana players
KF Tërbuni Pukë players
1. FC Frankfurt players
KS Kastrioti players
KF Vllaznia Shkodër players
Kategoria Superiore players
Kategoria e Parë players
Albanian expatriate footballers
Expatriate footballers in Germany
Albanian expatriate sportspeople in Germany